Sven Roger Blomquist (25 September 1956 – 15 September 2014) was a Swedish sports journalist, working for state broadcaster SVT.

Blomquist died on 15 September 2014 after a brief illness, one week and three days before his 58th birthday.

References

1956 births
2014 deaths
Swedish sports journalists
Swedish sports broadcasters
People from Enköping